is a Buddhist temple of the Tendai sect located in the city of Shibukawa in Gunma Prefecture, Japan. It is 16th stop on the Bandō Sanjūsankasho pilgrimage route of 33 temples sacred to Kannon in the Kantō region.

History
The foundation of the temple is uncertain and all ancient documentary evidence  pre-dating the Edo period has been lost. According to temple's own legend, it was founded in the Asuka period under the sponsorship of the Kokushi of Kōzuke province Takanobe Ienari. during the reign of Empress Suiko, who invited Ekan, a high-ranking prelate from Goguryeo to introduce Buddhism to the region. The honzon statue of Kannon Bosatsu is said to have been then personal statue of his daughter, Ikaho-hime. The temple has bene destroyed by fires several times in its history.

The temple’s two-story Rokkaku-dō with a hexagonal base is registered as a Gunma Prefectural Important Cultural Property. It contains a rotating sutra library on its ground floor and a state of Dainichi Nyōrai on its second story.

Gallery

External links

Bando Pilgrimage site

Buddhist temples in Gunma Prefecture
Tendai temples
Shibukawa, Gunma
Kōzuke Province